Roy Kubig (born 25 December 1958) is an Australian Paralympic swimmer. At the 1976 Toronto Games, he competed in five swimming events and he won a bronze medal in the Men's 50 m Backstroke 3 event.

Roy was born in Home Hill, Queensland, Australia. He attended Home Hill State High School and started his swimming career swimming against able-bodied swimmers at Home Hill Swimming Club.

References

External links
 

1958 births
Living people
Male Paralympic swimmers of Australia
Paralympic bronze medalists for Australia
Paralympic medalists in swimming
Swimmers at the 1976 Summer Paralympics
Medalists at the 1976 Summer Paralympics
Australian male freestyle swimmers
Australian male backstroke swimmers
Australian male breaststroke swimmers
Australian male butterfly swimmers
Australian male medley swimmers
20th-century Australian people